The Econfina River is a minor river draining part of the Big Bend region of Florida, U.S.A. into Apalachee Bay. The river rises in San Pedro Bay near the boundary between Madison and Taylor counties, and flows  through Taylor County to Apalachee Bay.

The name "Econfina" derives from the Creek ekana, which means "earthy", and feno, which means "bridge" or "footlog". This name may refer to a natural bridge over the river in the Natural Well Branch tract.

References 

 Marth, Del. 1990. "Econfina River". in Marth, Del and Marty Marth, eds. The Rivers of Florida. Sarasota, Florida: Pineapple Press, Inc. .

Rivers of Florida
Bodies of water of Madison County, Florida
Rivers of Taylor County, Florida
Subterranean rivers of the United States